Matthew Brian Barnes-Homer (born 25 January 1986) is an English professional footballer who is a player/coach as a striker for Gloucester City.

Barnes-Homer started his career as a youth player at Wolverhampton Wanderers, where he spent three years. In 2004 he transferred to Aldershot Town. He then played for various non-league clubs in his local West Midlands region between 2005 and 2007 until League Two side Wycombe Wanderers signed him on a short-term contract in March 2007. He was released shortly afterwards, where he joined Conference National side Kidderminster Harriers. After a lean first season at the club, Barnes-Homer established himself as top scorer in the next campaign with 25 goals, averaging almost one goal for every two games.

A similar goal return during 2009–10 prompted interest from former Football League club Luton Town, who signed him in January 2010. He finished the 2010–11 season as Luton's top scorer with 29 goals. He left Luton in early 2012, going on to spend four months at Swedish side Östersunds FK, before returning to the Conference with Macclesfield Town for the start of the 2012–13 season. In August 2013, he signed a two-year contract with Forest Green Rovers. On 10 January 2014, Barnes-Homer signed for Cambridge United on a free transfer until the end of the season.

Club career
Born in Dudley, West Midlands, Barnes-Homer began his career as a 15-year-old trainee at Wolverhampton Wanderers, but was released three years later at the end of the 2003–04 season.He then joined Hednesford Town, where he made one substitute appearance, and was signed by Bromsgrove Rovers in April 2005 after impressing in Bromsgrove's reserve side.

Barnes-Homer had a short spell at Tividale before he joined Willenhall Town in August 2008 and scored a hat-trick on his debut against Stourbridge. After impressive performances for Willenhall, he joined League Two club Wycombe Wanderers in March 2007 after a successful trial. However, he was one of several players released at the end of the 2006–07 season after Wycombe failed to reach the League Two play-offs.

He joined Conference Premier side Kidderminster Harriers in July 2007 after featuring in pre-season games. After scoring 6 league goals during the 2007–08 season, he signed a new one-year contract in April 2008.

Barnes-Homer scored 21 goals the next season, ending the campaign as highest goalscorer at the club as Kidderminster finished narrowly outside the play-offs. He signed a new two-year contract with the club in June 2009.

Barnes-Homer began the 2009–10 season for Kidderminster as he had finished the last, with a return of roughly one goal in every two games. His goalscoring form did not go unnoticed and, on 26 November 2009, Barnes-Homer joined Luton Town, initially on a one-month loan deal. On 13 January 2010 the transfer led to a permanent two-and-a-half-year-contract, for which Luton paid Kidderminster a five-figure fee, believed to be around £75,000.

Barnes-Homer made a below-average start to his Luton career, with just three goals in 20 league games. Luton manager Richard Money cited the fact that Barnes-Homer had lost his stepfather mid-season as reason for his poor form. Money believed that in the following season, Luton fans would see the real Matthew Barnes-Homer and that he would be akin to a brand new signing. This faith from the manager paid off, as Barnes-Homer scored five goals in the opening three games of the 2010–11 season, including a hat-trick away against Kettering Town. He fell out of favour with new Luton manager Gary Brabin towards the end of the season, being used primarily as a substitute, including in the club's play-off final defeat to AFC Wimbledon. Barnes-Homer ended the season as Luton's top scorer with 19 goals, 16 of which came in the league.

He started Luton's first game of the 2011–12 season, though was substituted after an hour. On 25 August 2011, Barnes-Homer joined League One side Rochdale on loan until January 2012, making only five league appearances in five months. He left Luton on 1 January 2012, his contract terminated by mutual consent. On the decision to terminate Barnes-Homer's contract, Luton manager Gary Brabin stated "I just felt from the beginning of the season that it wasn't going to work out, that's why we decided to loan him to Rochdale. It hasn't worked out for him there and I didn't feel it was going to be right for him to come back."

On 24 February 2012, Barnes-Homer joined Conference North side Nuneaton Town. He made only one appearance for the club in the Birmingham Senior Cup before leaving on 20 March to join Swedish third division side Östersunds FK. He played in 11 league games, scoring twice, before returning to England on 27 June to sign for Macclesfield Town in the Conference Premier.

On 5 January 2013, he scored both goals late on in a third round FA Cup tie for Macclesfield against Championship leaders Cardiff City in a 2–1 victory, putting his team through to the fourth round for the first time.

Having netted 21 times in league and cup competitions in the 2012–13 season for Macclesfield, he trialled with League One side Notts County but failed to earn a deal. On 27 July 2013, he featured for Conference Premier side Alfreton in a pre-season friendly and just two days later he played over an hour for Forest Green Rovers in their friendly clash with Yeovil Town. After another trial appearance against Weston-super-Mare, he signed a two-year contract with Forest Green on 5 August 2013. He made a goal scoring debut for the club on 10 August 2013 in an 8–0 win against Hyde. In January 2014, just six months into his two-year contract, he moved on a free transfer to Forest Green's league rivals Cambridge United. On 28 February, Barnes-Homer joined Tamworth on loan. The following day he was selected in the starting eleven against FC Halifax Town which Cambridge drew 1–1 despite dominating for longer periods. Cambridge released Barnes-Homer on 27 May 2014.

Barnes-Homer joined AFC Telford United in 2017, later taking a coaching position with the club. In October 2021, Barnes-Homer joined Southern League Premier Division Central side Stourbridge on a dual-registration basis.

On 24 March 2022, Barnes-Homer signed for Southern League Premier Division Central side Bromsgrove Sporting.

On 3 June 2022, Bromsgrove Sporting confirmed that Barnes-Homer, along with team mates Tom Taylor and Miro Pais had all agreed deals to stay with the club for the 2022–23 season.

International career
Barnes-Homer was named in the England C squad that played Poland under-23's on 17 November 2009. He scored the winning goal on his debut in a 2–1 victory. On 9 February 2011, Barnes-Homer scored the winning goal in a 1–0 win against Belgium under-23's that put England C into the final of the International Challenge Trophy.

References

External links

1986 births
Living people
English footballers
Sportspeople from Dudley
England semi-pro international footballers
Association football forwards
Wolverhampton Wanderers F.C. players
Aldershot Town F.C. players
Hednesford Town F.C. players
Bromsgrove Rovers F.C. players
Tividale F.C. players
Willenhall Town F.C. players
Wycombe Wanderers F.C. players
Kidderminster Harriers F.C. players
Luton Town F.C. players
Rochdale A.F.C. players
Nuneaton Borough F.C. players
Östersunds FK players
Macclesfield Town F.C. players
Forest Green Rovers F.C. players
Cambridge United F.C. players
Tamworth F.C. players
Whitehawk F.C. players
Farnborough F.C. players
Wilmington Hammerheads FC players
AFC Telford United players
Stourbridge F.C. players
Bromsgrove Sporting F.C. players
English Football League players
National League (English football) players
Southern Football League players
USL Championship players
Expatriate footballers in Sweden
Expatriate soccer players in the United States
English expatriate sportspeople in the United States
English expatriate footballers